Lin Tzu-hui (born 1 November 1981) is a Taiwanese powerlifter. She competed in the 2004 in Athens and the 2008 Summer Paralympics in Beijing and won a gold medal in each. She competed in the 2012 Summer Paralympics in London and achieved a Bronze Medal (less than 75 kg). She qualified for the 2016 Summer Paralympics in Rio, and was also the flag bearer for Chinese Taipei.

She held the world record in 2014 after lifting 129 kg which was the highest for a woman in her class.

References

1981 births
Living people
Powerlifters at the 2016 Summer Paralympics
Female powerlifters
Paralympic powerlifters of Chinese Taipei
Medalists at the 2004 Summer Paralympics
Medalists at the 2008 Summer Paralympics
Medalists at the 2012 Summer Paralympics
Medalists at the 2016 Summer Paralympics
Paralympic medalists in powerlifting
Paralympic gold medalists for Chinese Taipei
Paralympic bronze medalists for Chinese Taipei